Kang Yootaek (born 26 November 1991) is a Korean 9 dan professional Go player. He was ranked #13 (as of April 2011) in the official rating system of the Korea Baduk Association (the Hanguk Kiwon).

Biography 
Kang started to play Go at the age of 7. He is a member of the Yangchun Dail Baduk School. He became professional in 2007 by winning the Korean Insei league. He is ranked 9-dan.

Titles and runners-up

References

External links 
 Hanguk Kiwon official profile
 Sensei's Library page

1991 births
Living people
South Korean Go players